Olivier ter Horst (born 6 April 1989 in Nijmegen) is a former Dutch footballer who played as a defender. He formerly played for Heracles Almelo and Helmond Sport. After the 2012/13 season, he retired from professional football as he wanted to focus on his public career.

References

External links 
 Olivier ter Horst bio

1989 births
Living people
Footballers from Nijmegen
Association football defenders
Dutch footballers
Heracles Almelo players
Helmond Sport players
Eredivisie players
Eerste Divisie players
Quick 1888 players